All Our Yesterdays by Harry Warner, Jr., is a history of science fiction fandom of the 1940s, an essential reference work in the field.

It was originally published by Advent in 1969; the members of the World Science Fiction Society voted its author the Hugo Award for Best Fan Writer that year. NESFA Press produced a new edition with additional photographs, in 2004, after Warner's death.

Warner also wrote a related series of historical columns called "All Our Yesterdays." He later published a sequel, A Wealth of Fable, covering the 1950s, originally produced in a three-volume mimeographed edition, the first volume issued in 1976, and later expanded into hardcover form by SCIFI Press in 1992.

Reception
Algis Budrys praised Warner's work as "that calm, reasoned, and, I suppose, sometimes slightly prejudiced 'fan history' that the microcosm needs as a counterweight" to Sam Moskowitz's earlier The Immortal Storm.

Science fiction fan and author Mike Resnick called the book "a fabulous, informal history, covering all the high points, reporting on (for example) the initial meeting after the war between DAW (Wollheim) and SaM (the man who barred him from the first Worldcon), filled with well over 100 photos, even indexed. It's a true treasure of fannish history and anecdotes."

References

External links
Publisher's information on All Our Yesterdays
All Our Yesterdays columns
Publisher's information on A Wealth of Fable

1969 non-fiction books
20th-century history books
Works about science fiction
NESFA Press books